Saqi is a 1952 Indian Hindi-language film directed by H. S. Rawail and starring Premnath, Madhubala in lead roles. The film's music was composed by C. Ramchandra. Saqi was based on Arabian Nights and was one of the most expensive Indian films at the time of its release.

Plot 
The film told the story a common man named Ajeeb, who tries to woo the princess Rukhsana.

Cast 
 Premnath as Ajeeb
 Madhubala as Rukhsana
 Gope as Genie
 Randhir as Sultan
 Iftekhar as Abdul
 Cuckoo as the item number "Door Door Se"

Production 
Saqi was the Indian version of Arabian Nights. The film was announced in February 1951, along with Badal, also starring Premnath & Madhubala. While Badal was completed and released in the same year, Saqi took about one and a half year to complete. Saqi was an expensive venture for the producers and it was made on a huge budget of 10 lakhs.

Soundtrack

Reception 
Saqi had a mixed reception with critics—the soundtrack and lavish sets were noted, but acting and screenplay were poorly received. Nevertheless, the film became a commercial success.

References

Sources

External links 

1950s Hindi-language films
1952 films
Films directed by H. S. Rawail
Indian romantic fantasy films
Films based on One Thousand and One Nights